The 2021 season was the Northern Superchargers first season of the new franchise 100 ball cricket, The Hundred. While not being a successful season for either the men's or women's teams, the men's team did set the record for becoming the first team to score 200 runs in a game, scoring 200 on 12 August 2021 in their win against Manchester Originals.

Players

Men's side 
 Bold denotes players with international caps.

Women's side 
 Bold denotes players with international caps.

Regular season

Fixtures (Men)

July

August

Fixtures (Women)

July

August

Standings

Women

 advances to the Final
 advances to the Eliminator

Men

 advances to the Final
 advances to the Eliminator

References

Cricket clubs established in 2019
2019 establishments in England
The Hundred (cricket)